Satya Atluri is an American engineer, educator, researcher and scientist in aerospace engineering, mechanical engineering and computational sciences, who is currently the Presidential Chair & University Distinguished Professor at Texas Tech University. Since 1966, he made fundamental contributions to the development of finite element methods, boundary element methods, Meshless Local Petrov-Galerkin (MLPG) methods, Fragile Points Methods (FPM), Local Variational Iteration Methods, for general problems of engineering, solid mechanics, fluid dynamics, heat transfer, flexoelectricity, ferromagnetics, gradient and nonlocal theories, nonlinear dynamics, shell theories, micromechanics of materials, structural integrity and damage tolerance, Orbital mechanics, Astrodynamics, etc.

Atluri was elected as a member into the National Academy of Engineering in 1996 for contributions to computational methods for fracture mechanics and analysis of aerospace structures. He was also elected to the Indian National Academy of Engineering in 1997, the European Academy of Sciences in 2002, the World Academy of Sciences in 2003, the National Academy of Sciences of Ukraine (Stephen Timoshenko Institute) in 2008, and the oldest academy in the modern world, the Academy of Athens in 2013.

He received the Padma Bhushan Award, the third highest civilian honor in the Republic of India, in the category of science and technology, from the president of India in 2013.

His research interests lie in the areas of aerospace engineering, mechanical engineering, applied mechanics & mathematics, Materials Genome, and computer modeling in engineering & sciences.

He mentored about 600 undergraduate and graduate students, postdocs, visiting scholars, and visiting professors at various universities around the world.

He authored or edited 55 books and monographs and authored more than 800 archival research papers.

Education and career
Atluri received his pre-university education at the Government College, Rajahmundry, university education at Andhra University (1964) at the engineering college in Kakinada now known as the Jawaharlal Nehru Technological University, Kakinada, the Indian Institute of Science (1966), and Massachusetts Institute of Technology (earned, March 1969). He received Doctor of Science degrees from Massachusetts Institute of Technology (March 1969), National University of Ireland (1988, honoris causa), Slovak Academy of Sciences (2005, honoris causa), University of Patras, Greece (2007, honoris causa),  University of Nova Gorica, Slovenia (2009, honoris causa), and University of Montenegro Podgorica, Montenegro (2020,honoris causa). He joined MIT as a research associate from 1969 to 1971 and then joined the faculty in the Aero & Astro department at the University of Washington as an assistant professor from 1971 to 1973. He moved to Georgia Tech as a professor of Engineering Science & Mechanics from 1973 to 1979, and became the youngest regents’ professor of Engineering to be appointed in Georgia Tech's history from 1979 to 1998. He was the first institute professor to be appointed in Georgia Tech's history from 1991 to 1998. From 1991 to 1998, he became the director of Federal Aviation Administration National Center for Aircraft Structures, and was appointed as Hightower Chair in Engineering at Georgia Tech from 1996 to 1998. He was also appointed as Jerome C. Hunsaker Professor of Aeronautics at MIT from 1990 to 1991, Distinguished Professor of aerospace engineering at University of California, Los Angeles from 1996 to 2002, and the Theodore von Karman Chair Professor in Aerospace Engineering and Distinguished Professor, University of California, Irvine from 2002 to 2015. In December 2015, he moved to Lubbock, Texas, and joined the faculty of Texas Tech University as the Presidential Chair and University Distinguished Professor.

He was honored as Faculty Fellow and Eminent Scholar at the Hagler Institute for Advanced Studies at Texas A & M University, and as Distinguished Professor of Multidisciplinary Engineering & Computer Science, King Abdulaziz University, Saudi Arabia, from 2013 to the present. He was honored as the Tsinghua Honorary Chair Professor at the National Tsing Hua University in Taiwan from 2009 to 2012; World-Class University Program Distinguished Visiting Professor (Type III) at Pusan National University, South Korea from 2009 to 2014. He was an honorary professor at Tsinghua University, Beijing from 2003 to 2007; Lanzhou University, China from 2013 to now; and Southwest Jiaotong University-Emei, China from 1986 and University of Patras, Greece, since 2008. He also received honorary positions at the Korea Advanced Institute of Science & Technology 1988–1991, and at the Hong Kong University of Science and Technology in 1996 and 1997, as the Royal Society Ping To Professor. He was in Japan Society for the Promotion of Science Visiting Professor at the University of Tokyo.

Professional affiliations
He is a Fellow of the American Academy of Mechanics (1981); the American Institute of Aeronautics and Astronautics (1991); ASME (1998); the Aeronautical Society of India (1990); the Chinese Society of Theoretical & Applied Mechanics; the United States Association for Computational Mechanics (1995); the International Association of Computational Mechanics (1997); Honorary Fellow of the International Congress on Fracture (1993); and several other international academic and professional societies.

He was elected to membership in the US National Academy of Engineering (1996); the Indian National Academy of Engineering (1997); The World Academy of Sciences (2003, Trieste); the European Academy of Sciences (2002); The National Academy of Sciences of Ukraine (2008); the Academy of Athens, Greece (2013); and the Academy of Medicine, Engineering and Science of Texas (2016).

Government and professional service
He served as a member on, as well as the chair of the US President's Committee for National Medal of Technology and Innovation (1992–1998); as a member of the Research, Engineering, and Development Advisory Committee to the administrator of the Federal Aviation Administration (1994–1998); vice-chair, Peer Review Committee, Aerospace Section, National Academy of Engineering (1998–2000); chair, Peer review Committee, Aerospace Section, National Academy of Engineering (2000–2002); member, Committee on Membership, National Academy of Engineering (2002–2005). He also served on the NRC Panels of the NAS/NAE, and Decadal Surveys of Aeronautics for NASA. He served as a member of the Board of Visitors for the Army Research Office of the US Army Research Laboratory during 1996–1999.

Recognitions
He was awarded Padma Bhushan in Science & Engineering (National Medal of Science & Engineering, India) in 2013. The president of India, Dr. Pranab Kumar Mukherjee, conferred upon the Padma Bhushan Award (India's National Medal of Science & Technology) to Atluri at the Rashtrapati Bhawan (President's Residence) in New Delhi on April 20, in a Nationally Televised Ceremony in India.
 
On April 29, 2014, he was inducted as a Corresponding Member of the Academy of Athens, Greece, the oldest organized scientific and philosophical academy in the history of the modern world.

He received the Walter J. and Angeline H. Crichlow Trust Prize (a $100,000 Global Aerospace Prize) in 2015; the Structures, Structural Dynamics, & Materials Lecture Award in 1998; the Structures, Structural Dynamics, and Materials Medal in 1988; and the Pendray Aerospace Literature Medal in 1998.  All these awards are from the American Institute of Aeronautics and Astronautics.

In May 2017, he was given the Glorious India Award at the Glorious India Convention & Exposition. He also received some notable honors including the Nadai Medal, Materials Division in 2012 from American Society of Mechanical Engineers; Aerospace Structures & Materials Award from American Society of Civil Engineers in 1986; Excellence in Aviation Medal from Federal Aviation Administration & Office of Science and Technology Policy in 1998; the Computational Mechanics Medal of Greek National Association of Computational Mechanics in 1998; the Outstanding Achievement Award from National Academy of Engineering in 1995; the Eringen Medal of Society of Engineering Science in 1995; Computational Mechanics Medal from Japan in 1991; Class of 1934 Distinguished Professor Award (the Highest Award Given to a Faculty Member each year) in 1986, and twice the Outstanding Researcher Award in 1991 and 1993 at Georgia Institute of Technology; Monie Ferst Sustained Research Award of Society of Sigma-Xi in 1988.

He received the Hilbert Medal from the International Conference on Computational ad Experimental Engineering and Sciences in 2003, and the ICCES Medal from the same organization in 1992.

He received a Distinguished Service Citation, National Medal of Technology (now National Medal of Technology and Innovation) Selection Committee of United States Secretary of Commerce from 1992 to 1998. In the year of 2001, he was elected as the Distinguished Alumnus of the Indian Institute of Science, Bangalore (IISc). In 1992 he was selected as one of 25 Distinguished Alumni of the Aerospace Department at I.I.Sc during its Golden Jubilee, and in 2017 he was selected as one of 75 Distinguished Alumni on the occasion of its Platinum Jubilee.

He was listed in the Roll of Honors in the Aerospace Department at the Indian Institute of Science in 1966 (for being the top-ranking student that year), and received the V.K. Murthy Gold Medal and the Lazarus Prize from Andhra University in 1964 (for being the top-ranking student in engineering in the university that year). 
 
He has been a Midwestern Mechanics Lecturer (1989), as well as a Southwestern Mechanics Lecturer (1987).
 
In 1998, he was awarded the fellowship of the Japan Society for the Promotion of Science.
 
He founded ICCES which established the Satya N. Atluri ICCES Medal in honor of its founder. He received the Hilbert Medal in 2003 and ICCES Medal in 1992.

Other activities
In 1986, Atluri founded a scientific association, ICCES: International Conference on Computational & Experimental Engineering & Sciences. ICCES held annual meetings of scientists from various countries in general, and Asia in particular: Tokyo (1986); Atlanta (1988); Melbourne, Australia (1991); Hong Kong (1992); Hawaii (1995); Costa Rica 91997); Atlanta (1998); Los Angeles (2000); Puerto Vallarta, Mexico (2001); Reno, Nevada (2002); Corfu, Greece (2003); Madeira, Portugal (2004); Chennai, India (2005, held on the occasion of the 60th birthday of Atluri at IIT Madras. The inaugural lecture was delivered by the then president of the Republic of India, The Honorable Dr. A.P.J. Abdul Kalam); Miami (2007); Hawaii, US (2008); and Phuket, Thailand (2009). Las Vegas (2010); Nanjing, China (2011); Crete, Greece (2012); Seattle, US (2013); Changwon, South Korea (2014); Reno, US (2015); Madeira, Portugal (2017) and Tokyo, Japan (2019).
 
ICCES has established several international awards, including the Satya N. Atluri ICCES Medal, Hilbert Medal, Eric Reissner Medal, THH Pian Medal, W-Z. Chien Medal, K Washizu Medal, Sejong Award, AS Kobayashi Medal for Young Scientists in Experimental Research, S. Ramanujan Medal for Outstanding Young Scientists in Computation, and S. Chandrasekhar Medal for Outstanding Young Scientists in Theory.
 
Atluri is the founder of FSL: A Global Forum on Structural Longevity (Health Management, Failure Prevention, & Infrastructure Rehabilitation).
 
He founded the journals Computer Modeling in Engineering & Sciences (2000); Computers, Materials, & Continua (2004); Molecular & Cellular Biomechanics (2004); Structural Longevity (2008); and Advances in Computational Mechanics (2008), all of which are published by Tech Science Press. All these journals are in the frontier disciplines of engineering and the sciences, and especially at the interfaces of engineering and the sciences. Previously, Atluri founded, and was editor-in-chief of, the international journal Computational Mechanics, from 1986 to 2000.
 
His philanthropy includes support to the Innovation Center, The Center for Early Education, Los Angeles, and the establishment of the Revati & Satya Nadham Atluri Chair in Biosciences, Indian Institute of Science.

Citation metrics
From the Science Citation Index, he is on the original list of 100 most highly cited researchers in engineering, 1980–2000, one of the best 3000 scientific minds in the world from 2014 to 2018, and one of 3000 most highly cited researchers in the world in all disciplines, based on research published during 2002–2018. From the Google Scholar citation, he is also ranked as the most highly cited researcher in the world in aerospace engineering, the second most highly cited researcher in the world in fracture mechanics, the sixth most highly cited researcher in the world in mechanics, and the 12th most highly cited researcher in the world in applied mathematics. Five out of the ten most highly cited papers in the journal Computational Mechanics (Springer) from 1985 to 2014 were authored by Atluri. Six out of the ten most highly cited papers in the journal CMES: Computer Modeling in Engineering & Sciences from 1999 to 2014 were authored by Atluri.

Selected publications

Selected honors and awards
 Revati & Satya Nadham Atluri Chair in Biological Sciences, Indian Institute of Science (2018)
 Crichlow Trust Prize, AIAA (a $100,000 Global Aerospace Prize)
 Padma Bhushan (India), 2013
 The NADAI Medal (ASME), 2012
 Excellence in Aviation Award (FAA), 1998
 The Structures, Structural Dynamics, and Materials Medal (AIAA), 1988
The Structures, Structural Dynamics and Materials Lecture Award (AIAA), 1998
 The Pendray Aerospace Literature Medal (AIAA), 1998
 The Aerospace Structures and Materials Award (ASCE), 1986
 Hilbert Medal (ICCES), 2003
 ICCES Medal (ICCES), 1992
 Eringen Medal (Society of Engineering Science), 1995
 The Satya N. Atluri ICCES Medal, ICCES

References

External links
Professor Satya N. Atluri at TTU
Google Scholar Satya N. Atluri

American aerospace engineers
Members of the United States National Academy of Engineering
Living people
Indian Institute of Science alumni
Indian emigrants to the United States
Fellows of the American Society of Mechanical Engineers
Indian aerospace engineers
Recipients of the Padma Bhushan in science & engineering
UCLA Henry Samueli School of Engineering and Applied Science faculty
Georgia Tech faculty
MIT School of Engineering faculty
Massachusetts Institute of Technology alumni
University of Washington faculty
Academic staff of the National Tsing Hua University
Academic staff of the University of Patras
Academic staff of Tsinghua University
Academic staff of KAIST
Academic staff of the Hong Kong University of Science and Technology
American academics of Indian descent
20th-century Indian engineers
Engineers from Andhra Pradesh
People from Krishna district
1945 births
Indian scholars